The 2008 New England Revolution season was the thirteenth season of the team's existence. The regular season began on March 29, 2008 with a 3-0 win over the Houston Dynamo and ended on November 6 with a 3-0 playoff loss to the Chicago Fire.

Background 
After losing a third straight MLS Cup final in 2007, the Revs began the 2008 season with high hopes. For the first time in team history, New England participated in four different competitions during the regular season. Their 2007 U.S. Open Cup had qualified them for the preliminary round of the inaugural CONCACAF Champions League, and their top-four finish qualified them for the 2008 North American SuperLiga. The Revs also played matches in the 2008 Open Cup and the 2008 regular season.

Review 
The club started the season well, reaching their July league-fixture recess at the top of the overall MLS table. This early-season success continued in the 2008 SuperLiga, which the club won on August 5, 2008 by beating their 2-time MLS Cup rival the Houston Dynamo on penalties. Injuries, fatigue, and fixture congestion eventually caught up with the Revs, however, and the team performed poorly after returning to MLS league play. In an effort to spell his regular starters, coach Steve Nicol started mostly reserves in an Open Cup semifinal against D.C. United. The Revs lost the match, and Nicol was widely criticized for the decision. The Revolution also crashed out of the CONCACAF Champions League, losing to regional minnows Joe Public FC of Trinidad and Tobago 6-1 on aggregate, including an embarrassing 4-0 defeat at Gillette Stadium.

Mostly on the strength of their hot start, the Revolution managed to make the playoffs. They were unable to advance, however, as they drew 0-0 at home and lost 3-0 away to the Chicago Fire.

Match results

MLS regular season

Open Cup

SuperLiga

Champions League

Playoffs

Standings

Conference

Overall

Notes

External Links
2008 Schedule

New England Revolution seasons
New England Revolution
New England Revolution
New England Revolution
Sports competitions in Foxborough, Massachusetts